Hugh Hare (1542–1620) was an English politician in the 16th Century.

Hare was born in Totteridge and was a lawyer at the Inner Temple. He was  M.P. for Haslemere from 1588 to 1589.

References

Members of the Inner Temple
People from Totteridge
1542 births
1620 deaths
English MPs 1589